Valayapathi is a 1952 Indian Tamil-language film,  directed  and produced by T. R. Sundaram. The film stars G. Muthukrishnan, Sowcar Janaki (in her Tamil debut), T. A. Jayalakshmi and K. K. Perumal. It was released on 17 October 1952, and failed at the box-office.

Plot 
The film is based on the epic Valayapathi from  one of The Five Great Epics of Tamil Literature.

Cast 

G. Muthukrishnan as Valayapathi
Sowcar Janaki as Sathyavathi
T. A. Jayalakshmi as Andhari
K. K. Perumal as Kanakavelalar
A. Karunanidhi
T. P. Muthulakshmi
M. S. S. Bhagyam
'Pulimoottai’ Ramasami
M. N. Krishnan
M. E. Havana
S. R. Lakshmi
K. K. Soundar
S. M. Thirupathisami
C. K. Soundararajan
K. T. Dhanalakshmi
M. A. Ganapathi
‘Master’ Sudhakar
‘Master’ Ramakrishnan
A. S. Mani

Soundtrack 
Music was composed by S. Dakshinamurthi and lyrics were penned by Bharathidasan, Kannadasan and K. D. Santhanam.

Release and reception 
Valayapathi was released on 17 October 1952, Diwali day. The magazine Sivaji positively reviewed the film. According to Janaki, the film failed at the box-office because it was released alongside Parasakthi which became more successful.

References

External links 
 

1950s Tamil-language films
1952 films
Films based on poems
Films scored by Susarla Dakshinamurthi
Indian black-and-white films